George Ian Murray (born 6 November 1940) is a former Australian cricketer who played a single match for Western Australia during the 1964–65 season. Born in South Perth, Western Australia, Murray's sole match at first-class level came in November 1964, in a Sheffield Shield match against Victoria at the WACA Ground in Perth. The match, which was the first of the season, ended in a draw after four days. Murray, who bowled right-arm fast-medium but batted left-handed, opened the bowling with Laurie Mayne in both innings. He took only one wicket in Victoria's innings, dismissing Ray Jordon, but finished with figures of 2/44 in the second innings. Murray did not play at state level again, with Western Australia's fast bowling stocks already including Mayne, Garth McKenzie, Des Hoare, and Jim Hubble, amongst others.

References

1940 births
Australian cricketers
Living people
Cricketers from Perth, Western Australia
Western Australia cricketers
Sportsmen from Western Australia